Insight on Africa: A Journal of Contemporary African Affairs is a refereed journal that provides a forum for discussion on foreign policies and developmental issues of African countries.

It is published twice a year by SAGE Publications in association with African Studies Association of India.

Abstracting and indexing 
Insight on Africa is abstracted and indexed in:
 J-Gate

External links
 
 Homepage

References
 http://www.africanstudies.in/
 http://publicationethics.org/members/insight-africa

SAGE Publishing academic journals
Biannual journals
Development studies journals
Economics journals
Publications established in 2013